Timeloss is the first studio album by the Swedish progressive rock band Paatos.

Track listing

 "Sensor" (5:11) 
 "Hypnotique" (8:32) 
 "Téa" (5:45) 
 "They Are Beautiful" (7:44) 
 "Quits" (12:17)

References

2002 debut albums
Paatos albums